Malaysia–Morocco relations refers to bilateral foreign relations between Malaysia and Morocco. Malaysia has an embassy in Rabat, and Morocco has an embassy in Kuala Lumpur. Both countries are members of the Organisation of Islamic Cooperation.

History 
Morocco established relations with Malaysia right after Malaysia's been formed in 1963. In 2010, Abdul Khalid Ibrahim who is the Menteri Besar of Selangor made a working visit to Morocco. While Moroccan former Minister of Tourism also made a visit to Malaysia on the same year.

Economic relations 
Several agreements and memorandum of understanding has been signed between the two countries. In 2008, the total trade between Malaysia and Morocco reached nearly $65 million. The total Malaysian exports to Morocco reached $50.6 million while Moroccan exports to Malaysia worth around $14.4 million. Malaysian exports are such as consumer products, electrical and electronic products, plastic, chemical materials and products, manufactured metals, products of animal origin, textile and clothing, rubber products, transportation equipment while Morocco exports were copper, semi products, mineral goods and other finished products. While investments from Malaysia are mainly in oil and gas in which Petronas is involved. Other Malaysian companies also has been invited to invest in Morocco especially on the housing sector and both countries working close on palm oil.

Education relations 
Between 2008 and 2009, 15 Moroccan scholarships were awarded to Malaysian students to undertake Arabic language and Islamic studies at Moroccan universities.

Cultural links 
Moorish architecture influences also can be found on several buildings in Putrajaya, which is the Malaysia's federal governments administrative centre.

Cyber security 
A memorandum of understanding on computer security were also signed to become close partners in cyber security.

References 

 
Morocco
Bilateral relations of Morocco